Alfred Hasell (1872 – 13 January 1955) was an English cricketer. He played in two first-class matches in New Zealand for Canterbury from 1894 to 1896.

See also
 List of Canterbury representative cricketers

References

External links
 

1872 births
1955 deaths
English cricketers
Canterbury cricketers
People from Croydon